Gabrielle Oberhänsli-Widmer (born June 16, 1957 in Menziken, Switzerland), is Professor of Jewish studies at the University of Freiburg.

Biography 
After her education Gabrielle Oberhänsli-Widmer worked as Teacher at the comprehensive school Kallern, at several junior high schools and at the Kantonsschule Rämibühl Zürich.

She studied French and Hebrew language at Zürich, Florence, Avignon, Lausanne and Lucerne. After her studies she earned the Licentiate, the Doctorate and the Habilitation.
She continued her studies at the Hebrew University of Jerusalem. After these studies she worked as lecturer, adjunct professor and privatdozent for Hebrew language, Medieval French literature and history of religions. She was visiting scholar for Jewish studies at the University of Jena (1999-2000) and at the University of Bern (2003-2004).

Since 2004 she is professor and head of department for Jewish studies at the university of Freiburg, Germany.

From 2008 to 2015 Oberhänsli-Widmer was head of the Faculty of Oriental Studies at the university of Freiburg together with Ulrich Rebstock.

She is editor of the scientific journals Judaica of the ZIID – Zurich Institute for Interreligious Dialogue, Kirche und Israel and Jahrbuch für Biblische Theologie (JBTh) and member of the managing board of the Jüdisch-Christliche Arbeitsgemeinschaft (Jewish-Christian workgroup) at Zürich.
More than 40 Articles of Gabrielle Oberhänsli-Widmer are free for download on the FreiDok http://www.freidok.uni-freiburg.de/.

Books

Selected publications

Editorships

References

External links 
 
 eurojewishstudies Oberhänsli-Widmer
 University Freiburg Oberhänsli-Widmer

1957 births
Living people
Judaic scholars
Swiss women academics